Microtoena  is a genus of flowering plants in the mint family, Lamiaceae, first described in 1889. It is native to eastern and southeastern Asia, primarily China.

Species
 Microtoena albescens C.Y.Wu & S.J.Hsuan - Guizhou
 Microtoena bhutanica Stearn - Bhutan
 Microtoena coreana H.Lév - Korea
 Microtoena delavayi Prain - Sichuan, Yunnan
 Microtoena esquirolii H.Lév. - Yunnan, Guizhou, Guangxi
 Microtoena griffithii Prain - Arunachal Pradesh, Bangladesh
 Microtoena insuavis (Hance) Prain ex Briq. - Thailand, Vietnam, Guangdong, Guizhou, Yunnan 
 Microtoena longisepala C.Y.Wu - Sichuan
 Microtoena maireana Hand.-Mazz. - Yunnan
 Microtoena megacalyx C.Y.Wu - Guizhou, Yunnan
 Microtoena miyiensis C.Y.Wu & H.W.Li - Sichuan
 Microtoena mollis H.Lév. - Guizhou, Yunnan, Guangxi
 Microtoena moupinensis (Franch.) Prain - Tibet, Sichuan
 Microtoena muliensis C.Y.Wu - Sichuan
 Microtoena nepalensis Stearn - Nepal
 Microtoena omeiensis C.Y.Wu & S.J.Hsuan - Sichuan
 Microtoena patchoulii (C.B.Clarke ex Hook.f.) C.Y.Wu & S.J.Hsuan - from Yunnan + Nepal south to Java
 Microtoena pauciflora C.Y.Wu - Yunnan
 Microtoena praineana Diels - Guizhou, Sichuan, Yunnan
 Microtoena robusta Hemsl. - Sichuan, Hubei
 Microtoena stenocalyx C.Y.Wu & S.J.Hsuan - Yunnan
 Microtoena urticifolia Hemsl. - Hubei, Hunan
 Microtoena vanchingshanensis C.Y.Wu & S.J.Hsuan - Guizhou
 Microtoena wardii Stearn - Tibet, Bhutan, Arunachal Pradesh

References

External links

Lamiaceae genera
Lamiaceae